Oskar Delago (born 25 March 1963) is a former Italian World Cup alpine ski racer.

Family
Four Alpine skiers from the Delago family have participated in World Cup and World Championships competitions. Siblings Oskar (born 1963) and Karla Delago (born 1965), specialists in speed events in the 1980s and their two granddaughters, Nicol (born 1996) and Nadia (born 1997), active in the 2010s.

World Championships results

References

External links
 

1963 births
Living people
Italian male alpine skiers
Sportspeople from Brixen